Thomas Moles (13 November 1871 – 3 February 1937) was a journalist and Ulster Unionist politician.

Life
Born in Belfast in 1871, Moles was the son of Edward Moles and Margaret née Carson and was educated at the Collegiate School, Ballymena. A journalist by profession, he was Leader Writer for the Belfast Telegraph from 1909 until 1924 and managing editor for that newspaper from 1924.

Moles was an Irish representative on the British press visit to Canada in 1911. He was a member of the Secretariat to the Irish Convention from 1917 to 1918.

Moles was MP for Belfast Ormeau 1918–1922 and Belfast South at Westminster from 1922 until he retired in 1929.

He was also an MP in the Northern Ireland House of Commons from 1921 to 1929 for South Belfast and for Belfast, Ballynafeigh from 1929 to his death in 1937. He was the first ever member declared elected to the Northern Ireland House of Commons. He was Chairman of the Ways and Means and Deputy Speaker of the Northern Ireland House of Commons from 7 June 1921 until his death; and  Member of the Privy Council of Northern Ireland in 1923.

Moles was married in Ramoan, Co Antrim on 20 March 1901 to Charlotte Brannigan and had three children. He was also a motorcycle enthusiast and helped to push through parliament the first Road Races Act, which made it legal for the roads on the Clady Course to be closed for the first Ulster Grand Prix motorcycle road race on 14 October 1922.

References

External links 
 
 

 

1871 births
1937 deaths
Journalists from Northern Ireland
Irish Unionist Party politicians
Ulster Unionist Party members of the House of Commons of Northern Ireland
Ulster Unionist Party members of the House of Commons of the United Kingdom
Members of the House of Commons of Northern Ireland 1921–1925
Members of the House of Commons of Northern Ireland 1925–1929
Members of the House of Commons of Northern Ireland 1929–1933
Members of the House of Commons of Northern Ireland 1933–1938
Members of the Parliament of the United Kingdom for Belfast constituencies (1801–1922)
Members of the Parliament of the United Kingdom for Belfast constituencies (since 1922)
Members of the Privy Council of Northern Ireland
UK MPs 1918–1922
UK MPs 1922–1923
UK MPs 1923–1924
UK MPs 1924–1929
Politicians from Belfast
Male non-fiction writers from Northern Ireland
Members of the House of Commons of Northern Ireland for Belfast constituencies